This is a list of forests in Iceland.

There are currently 26 forests under the management of the Icelandic Forest Service. Those forests are classified as national forests in accordance with the Forests and Forestry Act No. 33/2019. National forests may be privately owned but must be managed by the IFS or entities contracted by the IFS, such as individuals, municipalities or legal persons. Contracts between the IFS and private entities granting national forest classification must have a duration of at least 40 years.

List
Akurgerði
Arnaldsstaðaskógur (national forest)
Álfholtsskógur
Ásabrekka
Ásbyrgi (national forest)
Brynjudalsskógur
Bæjarstaðaskógur
Daníelslundur
Einkunnir
Elliðaárdalur
Eyjólfsstaðaskógur
Fossá
Furulundurinn (national forest)
Gaddstaðaflatir
Grundarreitur (national forest)
Guðmundarlundur
Gunnfríðarstaðaskógur
Hallormsstaðaskógur (national forest)
Hamrahlíð
Haukadalsskógur (national forest)
Haukadalur
Hálsaskógur
Hánefsstaðir
Heiðmörk
Hellisskógur
Hofsstaðaskógur
Hrútey
Höfðaskógur
Jafnaskarðsskógur (national forest)
Jórvíkurskógur (national forest)
Kirkjubæjarklaustur
Kirkjuhvammur
Kjarnaskógur
Kristnesskógur (national forest)
Laugalandsskógur
Laugarvatnsskógur (national forest)
Lágafell
Leyningshólar
Mela- og Skuggabjargaskógur (national forest)
Mógilsá (national forest)
Múlakot (national forest)
Norðurtunguskógur (national forest)
Rauðavatn
Reykholtsskógur
Reykjarhólsskógur (national forest)
Selskógur (national forest)
Sigríðarstaðaskógur (national forest)
Skarðsdalur
Skógarhlíð
Skógarreitur (national forest)
Snæfoksstaðir
Sólbrekkuskógur
Stálpastaðaskógur (national forest)
Svartiskógur
Tröð
Tumastaðir (national forest)
Tunguskógur
Vaðlaskógur
Vaglaskógur (national forest)
Vaglir (national forest)
Vatnshornsskógur (national forest)
Vinaskógur
Vífilsstaðavatn
Völvuskógur
Þjórsárdalur (national forest)
Þórðarstaðaskógur (national forest)
Þórsmörk (national forest)
Öskjuhlíð

See also
Icelandic Forest Service

References

External links
Icelandic Forest Service 
Icelandic Forest Service 

Forests

Forests of Iceland
Iceland